Coilopoceras is a compressed, involute, lenticular ammonitid from the Cretaceous (Albian to Turonian), with a narrow venter and raggedy ammonitic suture; type of the Coilopoceratidae, a family in the Acanthoceratoidea of the suborder Ammonitina.

Distribution 
Coilopoceras has an established range from the upper Albian to Turonian in the Late Cretaceous. Its distribution is widespread, from western North America (Mexico, New Mexico, Texas) through northern Africa (Egypt, Cameroon, Niger, Nigeria and Tunisia) and Europe (France) to the Middle East (Israel), Madagascar and South America (Brazil, Peru and Colombia; La Frontera and San Rafael Formations).

References

Bibliography

Further reading 
 
The Paleobiology Database - Coilopoceras entry accessed 2 December 2011

Ammonitida genera
Acanthoceratoidea
Cretaceous ammonites
Ammonites of Africa
Cretaceous Africa
Ammonites of Europe
Cretaceous France
Ammonites of North America
Cretaceous Mexico
Cretaceous United States
Ammonites of South America
Cretaceous Brazil
Cretaceous Colombia
Cretaceous Peru
Albian genus first appearances
Turonian genus extinctions
Fossil taxa described in 1903